Evarcha bakorensis is a jumping spider in the genus Evarcha. The male was first described in 2002 and the female in 2011.

Etymology
The species is named after Bakoré where the male holotype was found.

Description
It is generally brown in colour, with white patterns on the abdomen and some yellow legs.

Distribution
The species lives in Guinea and Nigeria.

References

Salticidae
Fauna of Guinea
Fauna of Nigeria
Spiders of Africa
Spiders described in 2002
Taxa named by Wanda Wesołowska